Steven Robert Haslam (born 6 September 1979) is an English former professional footballer who played as a defender. He is the academy manager at Sheffield Wednesday.

Playing career

Early career
Back in 1995, Steve Haslam captained an England schoolboys team to a 1–0 victory over a Brazilian team including Ronaldinho. The team he captained included the likes of Wes Brown, Michael Ball and Michael Owen (who scored the only goal).

Sheffield Wednesday
Steve then started his professional football career at Sheffield Wednesday, the team he had supported all his life. Signed as a trainee in the 1996–97 season, with big things expected of him he made his debut in the FA Premier League, aged 19 on Saturday, 8 May 1999 against Liverpool at Hillsborough. He played that game in front of 27,383 fans. The result was a 1–0 victory to, 'The Owls'.

He continued to make over 100 appearances and score 2 goals for the Yorkshire club. Showing ability to play across the back four and in midfield, he captained the side at every level including the first team.

He was released from the club along with 12 other players by Chris Turner in one of the biggest clear out of players the club had ever seen at the end of the 2003–2004 season before being signed by Halifax Town.

Halifax Town and Bury
After almost 100 games for Halifax, it was announced on 18 June 2007 that Steve had made a return to the football league by signing a two-year deal with Bury. His first goal for the club was a 30-yard shot against Notts County on 13 October 2007. Although he had a sustained run in the side towards the end of 2008–09 season due to injury to Paul Scott, his contract was not renewed at the end of the season.

Hartlepool United
Steve signed for League One side Hartlepool United on 6 August 2009, after impressing Director of Sport and his former boss at Sheffield Wednesday Chris Turner while on trial. Haslam made his debut for Pools on the opening game of the 2009/10 season in a 0-0 draw away at MK Dons. In May 2011 he signed a new contract with the club.
Haslam was released on 10 May 2012, he made 63 appearances in all competitions for the club.

AFC Fylde
On 18 September 2012, Haslam joined Northern Premier League side AFC Fylde on a free transfer.

Coaching career
Haslam holds a UEFA Pro Licence. Following his retirement from football, Haslam began coaching at Sheffield Wednesday's academy. In June 2017, Haslam was appointed as Sheffield Wednesday's academy manager.

Personal life
Haslam has a degree from Sheffield Hallam University in Business and Management which he studied part-time.

References

External links

Steve Haslam profile at Vital Hartlepool

1979 births
Living people
Footballers from Sheffield
English footballers
England youth international footballers
England semi-pro international footballers
Association football defenders
Sheffield Wednesday F.C. players
Halifax Town A.F.C. players
Northampton Town F.C. players
Bury F.C. players
Hartlepool United F.C. players
AFC Fylde players
Premier League players
English Football League players
Alumni of Sheffield Hallam University